Hyperolius polli, commonly known as the Tshimbulu reed frog, is a species of frog in the family Hyperoliidae.

It is known from only two locations – Tshimbulu sur Luebi in Kasai Province in the southwestern Democratic Republic of the Congo, and Rio Chingufo in northeastern Angola. Its natural habitats are rivers, swamps, freshwater marshes, and intermittent freshwater marshes.

References

Polli
Amphibians described in 1943
Taxonomy articles created by Polbot
Southern Congolian forest–savanna mosaic